Siphon (foaled November 11, 1991) is a Brazilian-bred Thoroughbred racehorse and multiple G1-winner in Brazil and the United States.

Background 
He was sired by the champion Itajara, who is considered by many to be the best Brazilian racehorse of all time. Siphon's dam is Ebrea, from the family of one of the founding mares of Haras São José e Expedictus.

Race career 
Siphon's racing career began in Brazil, where he ran in and won four of four races at Cidade Jardim. He was exported to Argentina in November, 1994, running unplaced in the Gran Premio Nacional and Gran Premio Carlos Pellegrini. Siphon was then exported to the United States, where he was trained by Richard Mandella and won the Hollywood Gold Cup Stakes and Santa Anita Handicap, among other races.

Stud career 
After retiring from his racing career, Siphon was syndicated and entered stud at Airdrie Stud in 1998. He had a promising start at stud. Siphon was moved to Regal Heir Farms in Pennsylvania for the 2006 breeding season. He later stood stud at Pin Oak Lane Stud, also in Pennsylvania. In 2010, Siphon was sold back to Brazil to stand stud at Haras Bagé do Sul. Siphon has sired multiple graded stakes winners, including Siphonic, Siphonizer, Sharp Impact, and I'm the Tiger.

Pedigree 

Siphon is inbred 4S × 4D to Maki, meaning Maki appears in the fourth generation on both the sire and dam's side of the pedigree.

References 

Racehorses bred in Brazil
1991 racehorse births
Thoroughbred family 4-b
Brazilian racehorses